Elisa Antonia Durán Barrera (born 16 January 2002) is a Chilean footballer who plays as a midfielder for Colo-Colo and the Chile women's national football team.

Club career
Durán played for Colo-Colo U-17 team in 2017 and 2018, winning the championship in both seasons.

In 2019, Durán graduated to Colo-Colo's first team, debuting at the Chilean women's football championship. During the season, Durán scored a goal on her team's victory against rivals Universidad de Chile.

International career
Durán was part of the Chile's U-17 squad that competed at the 2018 South American U-17 Women's Championship.

In 2019, Durán was selected as part of the team that competed at the 2019 FIFA Women's World Cup held in France, being the youngest player of the squad. She did not play at the World Cup.

References

2002 births
Living people
Chilean women's footballers
Chile women's international footballers
Colo-Colo (women) footballers
Women's association football midfielders
2019 FIFA Women's World Cup players
People from El Loa Province